Lise Davidsen (born 8 February 1987 in Stokke) is a Norwegian opera singer. She came to prominence after winning the Operalia competition in London in 2015, and is known as a lyric dramatic soprano.

Career 
Lise Davidsen was born in 1987 in Stokke, and began playing guitar and singing when she was fifteen. As she progressed, she focused on singing, and received a bachelor's degree from the Grieg Academy of Music in Bergen, Norway, in 2010. During this period she worked with well-known singers such as Bettina Smith and Hilde Haraldsen Sveen, and sang as a mezzo-soprano with the Norwegian Soloists Choir.

She then began studying for a Master's degree at the Royal Opera Academy in Copenhagen, and her teacher, Susanna Eken, helped her develop her voice as a soprano for opera. In 2014, she performed as a soloist with the Berlin Philharmonic at a concert of the Royal Danish Music Conservatory. That year, she graduated from the Royal Opera Academy, and was awarded the Léonie Sonning talent prize and the Danish Singers Award. She also received financial support from the Skipsreder Tom Wilhelmsen, Karen and Arthur Feldthusens, and Sine Butenschøns Foundations.

During this period, she made her first appearances with the Royal Danish Opera, during the 2012–13 season, as the Dog and Owl in The Cunning Little Vixen. She went on to sing Emilia in Verdi's Otello and Rosalinde in Strauss's Die Fledermaus, and won the Reumert Talentpris.

In 2015, she won first prize in the Queen Sonja Competition and first prize and audience prize in the Operalia competition in London. She also won three prizes at the 2015 Hans Gabor Belvedere Singing Competition in Amsterdam, and was an HSBC Aix-en-Provence Laureate, received a Statoil Talent Bursary Award, the Léonie Sonning Music Prize, and the Kirsten Flagstad Prize. In 2018, she received the Queen Ingrid Prize and was named the Gramophone Magazine Young Artist of the Year.

Davidsen has performed in many festivals and opera houses. In 2017, she made her debut at Glyndebourne, singing the title role in Strauss's Ariadne auf Naxos, gave her first recital at Wigmore Hall, and made her first performance at the BBC Proms. She has also performed at the Zürich Opera House, Vienna State Opera, Aix-en-Provence Festival, Royal Opera House, Teatro Colón, the Bavarian State Opera. During the 2017–18 season, she was an artist in residence with the Bergen Philharmonic Orchestra. She made her debut at the Metropolitan Opera, New York, in the leading role of Lisa in Tchaikovsky's The Queen of Spades in November 2019.

Davidsen debuted on 10 May 2021 at La Scala, when the Milanese opera house reopened its doors to the public after a six-month shutdown due to the Covid-19 pandemic. She delivered interpretations of arias by Henry Purcell, Richard Wagner, Richard Strauss, Giuseppe Verdi and Pyotr Ilyich Tchaikovsky.

Recordings
In 2016, Davidsen recorded songs by John Frandsen, on the Dacapo Records label, and later that year her record As Dreams, on BIS Records, featured her with the Norwegian Soloists' Choir, and the Oslo Sinfonietta, conducted by Grete Pedersen, singing works by Alfred Janson, Helmut Lachenmann, Per Nørgård, Kaija Saariaho, and Iannis Xenakis. She sang the role of Anitra in a recording of Peer Gynt with the Bergen Philharmonic Orchestra and Choir conducted by Edward Gardner on the Chandos label released in 2018. In May 2018 she signed an exclusive recording contract with Decca Classics, and on 31 May 2019, her self-titled debut solo album was released on the label. The album includes works by Strauss and Wagner performed with the Philharmonia Orchestra conducted by Esa-Pekka Salonen. Davidsen sang the role of Agathe in a complete recording of Der Freischütz conducted by Marek Janowski, released in 2019.

She also appears as Sieglinde in a DVD of a live performance of Die Walküre from the Royal Opera House, as Elisabeth in Tannhäuser, filmed at the Bayreuth Festival and as Fidelio/Leonore in a visual album of the last performance of Fidelio from the Royal Opera House before the lockdown in March 2020.

References

External links
 
 
 Interview with Lise Davidsen, Bachtrack
 "Opera singer Lise Davidsen: 'I was in survival mode' " by Richard Fairman, Financial Times'', 26 May 2022

Living people
1987 births
Musicians from Stokke
Norwegian operatic sopranos
Grieg Academy alumni
Operalia, The World Opera Competition prize-winners
21st-century Norwegian women opera singers